The D9 class were a class of diesel locomotives built by English Electric, Rocklea for Australian Iron & Steel's, Port Kembla steelworks between 1956 and 1960.

History
In the 1950s, Australian Iron & Steel commenced an extensive modernisation and expansion of its Port Kembla steelworks. To operate on the expanded 200 kilometre network, seven shunter locomotives were ordered from English Electric with the first entering service in September 1956. A further six were delivered in 1960. A distinct feature of the locomotives was a large cooling fan at the end of the hood.

A down turn in the early 1980s saw the class withdrawn, with D10 being hired to fellow BHP subsidiary Blue Circle Cement for use at Portland in 1982/83 and Berrima in 1986/87. In 1989 two were overhauled to replace locomotives on the neighbouring John Lysaght plant.

Six have been preserved:
D9 by the Lachlan Valley Railway, Cowra
D11 by the Dorrigo Steam Railway & Museum
D20, D21 and D23 by the Lithgow State Mine Heritage Park & Railway
D25 by the Canberra Railway Museum

References

BHP Billiton diesel locomotives
Bo-Bo locomotives
English Electric locomotives
Diesel locomotives of New South Wales
Railway locomotives introduced in 1956
Standard gauge locomotives of Australia
Diesel-electric locomotives of Australia